Simon Louis du Ry (13 January 1726 in Kassel - 23 August 1799 in Kassel) was a classical architect.

Biography 
Simon Louis du Ry was the son of the Huguenot architect Charles du Ry and grandson of Paul du Ry of Kassel. He was from a French refugee family, who after the revocation of the Edict of Nantes by Louis XIV had to leave France and went to Hessen under Landgrave Charles. After beginning studies in Stockholm, Sweden 1746–48 he was disappointed in his teacher Carl Hårleman and left for Paris to attend the architectural school of Jacques-François Blondel (École des Art) in 1748–52. After further educational trips in France and to Italy he returned to Kassel, Germany and became chief architect on the court after the death of this father. In 1766 he was installed as professor architectura civilis at the Collegium Carolinum in Kassel. 

Under Frederic of Hessen he was responsible for the transformation of the old and partly destroyed town of Kassel into a modern capital. The Königsplatz (Kings square) and the Friedrichsplatz (Frederics square) remain the main squares in Kassel.

Works 

 Kitchen Pavilion of the Orangerie in the Karlsaue, 1765–66, completed in 1770
 Garde du Corps Barracks
 Auebridge
 Opera house in Kassel, 1766–69
 Königsplatz (Royal Square), 1767
 Palace of Jungk, 1767–69
 Weißensteiner gate, from 1768–70
 Fridericianum, 1769–76
 Friedrichsplatz (Kassel), 1769
 Palais Waitz, from 1770
 Comedy House
 Opera Square (Kassel), 1770
 Elizabeth Church (Kassel), c. 1770
 (Old) Royal Gate (Kassel), from 1775
 Friedrichstor / Auetor, 1779–82
 Brothers Grimm-Platz (Wilhelmshöher Platz), 1781
 William Bridge, from 1788
 Model house, after 1789
 Parish, Kirchditmold, 1790–92
 Bellevue Palace (Draft Paul du Ry ), conversion to 1790

Simon Louis du Ry designed and executed many castles and palaces including:

 Castle Wilhelmsthal, Calden, (1749), 1756–58
 Well Windhausen, Niestetal district Heiligenrode, 1769
 Wabern hunting lodge, extension 1770
 Castle Hüffe, Prussian Oldendorf Lashorst district, 1775–84
 Fürstenberg Castle, 1776–83
 Castle Mountain Home (Eder), 1785–86
 Wilhelmshöhe Castle, Kassel, 1786
 Schönburg castle, Hofgeismar, 1787–89
 House Kassel and landgrave house, bath nominal village, 1790/91

References

Further reading 
 Hermann Phleps: Zwei Schöpfungen des Simon Louis du Ry aus den Schlössern Wilhelmstal und Wilhelmshöhe in Kassel, Ernst, Berlin 1908
 Eckard Wörner, Stadtsparkasse Kassel: Simon Louis du Ry: ein Wegbereiter klassizistischer Architektur in Deutschland, 1980
 Harald Brock: Die Landsitzarchitektur Simon Louis Du Rys, Marburg, Jonas Verlag für Kunst und Literatur GmbH 2009, 

1726 births
1799 deaths
Architects from Kassel
People from the Landgraviate of Hesse-Kassel
18th-century German architects